Oculus (a term from Latin oculus, meaning 'eye'), may refer to the following

Architecture
 Oculus (architecture), a circular opening in the centre of a dome or in a wall

Arts, entertainment, and media
 Oculus (film), a 2013 American supernatural psychological horror film directed by Mike Flanagan
 Oculus (perspective), the point in space where a viewer sees a scene to be depicted in a picture plane
 Oculus, art installation by Kristin Jones and Andrew Ginzel at the Chambers Street–World Trade Center/Park Place subway station in Lower Manhattan, New York City
 Occulus, a fictional super-villain in Marvel Comics

New York City transit stations
In Lower Manhattan, New York City, the Oculus is the name of the head houses for the following transit stations:
 Fulton Center
 World Trade Center Transportation Hub

Technology
 Oculus (brand), a division of Meta Platforms that develops the Oculus Rift device and related technologies
 Oculus Rift, a PC based virtual reality device
Oculus Rift S, a PC based virtual reality device, successor to the Oculus Rift
Oculus Quest, a standalone virtual reality device
Meta Quest 2, launched as Oculus Quest 2, a standalone virtual reality device, successor to the Oculus Quest

See also 
 Eye, an organ of the visual system
 Occult, the study of a deeper spiritual reality that extends beyond pure reason and the physical sciences
 Ocular (disambiguation)